A Partial Print is the third studio album by Tiger Lou.

Track listing
The More You Give (3:44)
The Less You Have To Carry (6:07)
So Demure (5:11)
Trust Falls (3:08)
An Atlas of Those Our Own (4:52)
Odessa (5:28)
Trails of Spit (4:01)
Coalitions (4:12)
Crushed by a Crowd (3:53)
A Partial Print (9:17)

References

2008 albums
Tiger Lou albums